Keipert may refer to:
 Helmut Keipert (born 1941), German Slavist and linguist
 James  Ashton Keipert (1922–2021), Australian pediatrician who first described the Keipert syndrome